Qandil or Kandil (Arabic: قنديل, 'candle') may refer to

Kandil, five Islamic holy nights, related to the life of Muhammad

Places 
 Kandil, Iran (Persian: كندال), West Azerbaijan, Iran
 Qandil, Iran (Persian: قنديل), Fars Province, Iran
 Qandil Mountains, a mountainous area of northern Iraq

People
 Abdel Hadi Kandil (born 1935), Egyptian chemist and politician
 Ahmed Kandil (died 1948), Egyptian swimmer
 Ali Kandil (born 1921), Egyptian football referee
 Fouad Qandil (1944–2015), Egyptian novelist
 Hamdi Qandil (1936–2018), Egyptian journalist
 Hesham Qandil (born 1962), Prime Minister of Egypt 2012–2013
 Qandil Cabinet
 Maor Kandil (born 1993), Israeli footballer
 Mohamed Mansi Qandil (born 1946), Egyptian author
 El-Sayed Mohamed Kandil (fl. 1948), Egyptian wrestler
 Yasmine Kandil, Egyptian-Canadian professor of applied drama

See also

 Kandeel, a lantern associated with Diwali
 Kandil simidi, a Turkish pastry
 Qandeel Baloch (1990–2016), murdered Pakistani model and actress